Dieter Klein (born 31 October 1988) is a German cricketer who most recently played for Leicestershire County Cricket Club. Primarily a left-arm fast-medium bowler, he also bats right handed.

As he holds a German passport, he is not considered as an overseas player in English domestic cricket. In February 2019, Klein attended a training camp with the German national cricket team, with the view to help Germany qualify via the Regional Finals of the 2018–19 ICC World Twenty20 Europe Qualifier group for the 2020 ICC T20 World Cup. In May 2019, he was named in Germany's squad for the Regional Finals of the 2018–19 ICC T20 World Cup Europe Qualifier tournament in Guernsey. He made his T20I debut for Germany against Spain on 8 March 2020.  

In September 2021, he was named in Germany's T20I squad for the Regional Final of the 2021 ICC Men's T20 World Cup Europe Qualifier tournament. In January 2022, he was named in Germany's team for the 2022 ICC Men's T20 World Cup Global Qualifier A tournament in Oman.

References

External links
 

1988 births
Living people
German cricketers
Germany Twenty20 International cricketers
South African cricketers
People from Lichtenburg
Leicestershire cricketers
North West cricketers
South African emigrants to Germany